The Kven language ( or ;  or ;  or) is a Finnic language or a group of Finnish dialects spoken in the northernmost parts of Norway by the Kven people. For political and historical reasons, it received the status of a minority language in 2005 within the framework of the European Charter for Regional or Minority Languages. Linguistically, however, it is seen as a mutually intelligible dialect of the Finnish language, and grouped together with the Peräpohjola dialects such as Meänkieli, spoken in Torne Valley in Sweden. While it is often considered a dialect in Finland, it is officially recognized as a minority language in Norway and some Kven people consider it a separate language.

There are about 1,500 to 10,000 known native speakers of this language, most of whom are over the age of 60. Middle aged speakers tend to have a passing knowledge of the language. They use it occasionally, but not frequently enough to keep it off the endangered list. People under the age of 30 rarely speak or know the language. However, children in the community of Børselv can learn Kven in their primary schools.

History 
Because of fears of Finnish expansion into Norway, there were attempts of assimilating of the Kven people into Norwegian society and to make the Kvens give up the Kven language. Norway saw the Kvens as a kind of a threat to Norwegian society and the attempt to assimilate the Kvens was much stronger than with the Sámi people.

The Kven Assembly was formed in 2007 and plans to standardize a Kven written language. The term Kven first appeared in Ohthere's tales from the 800s, along with the terms Finn and Norwegian. The area that the Kvens lived in was called Kvenland. They originally settled in Kvenland, which also expanded into the flat areas of the Bay of Bothnia. As the Kven community continued to grow and develop a long standing culture, the Norwegian state deemed the Kvens taxpayers and the term Kven soon became an ethnic term. In 1992, the European Charter for Regional and Minority Languages was enacted to protect regional and minority languages. It included Kven as a minority language; it is only protected under Part II. This means that the culture and language are barely protected under this charter and, with the language dying out, the Norwegian Kven Association deems it important that the language be moved to Part III.

Organizations 
The Norwegian Kven Organization was established in 1987. The organization currently has about 700 members and about eight local branches. The members report to the government about the history and rights of the Kven people. The members also try and highlight Kven news by advancing Kven media coverage. The organization has also been pushing the Norwegian government to establish a state secretary for Kven issues. Moving the language of Kven into kindergarten classrooms, as well as all other education levels is also a forefront issue that the organization is aiming to tackle.

Official status 
Since 2006, it has been possible to study the Kven culture and language at the University of Tromsø, and in 2007 the Kven language board was formed at the Kven institute, a national centre for Kven language and culture in Børselv, Norway. The council developed a written standard Kven language, using Finnish orthography to maintain inter-Finnish language understanding. The grammar, written in Kven, was published in 2014. A Norwegian translation published in 2017 is freely available.

Geographic distribution 
Today, most speakers of Kven are found in two Norwegian communities, Storfjord and Porsanger. A few speakers can be found other places, such as Bugøynes, Neiden, Vestre Jakobselv, Vadsø, and Nordreisa.

In northeastern Norway, mainly around Varanger Fjord, the spoken language is quite similar to standard Finnish, whereas the Kven spoken west of Alta, due to the area's close ties to the Torne Valley area along the border between Finland and Sweden, is more closely related to the Meänkieli spoken there.

In government report from 2005, the number of people speaking Kven in Norway is estimated to be between 2,000 and 8,000, depending on the criteria used, though few young people speak it, which is a major obstacle to its survival.

Phonology 
The phonology of Kven is similar to that of Finnish. However, Kven and Finnish diverge in the phonemic realization of some words. In addition, due to loanwords, the sound  is much more common in Kven than in Finnish: for example, Kven  ('project'), compared to Finnish .

Vowels 
Kven has 16 vowels, if one includes vowel length:

Consonants 
Kven has 14 consonants found in native vocabulary, and 4 consonants found in loanwords:

 are only found in loanwords.

Grammar 
Just like in Finnish, Kven has many noun cases. In Kven, the third person plural verb ending uses the passive form.

The letter h is also very common in Kven; there are rules on where it is used.

 Passives – 
 Illative cases – 
 Third infinites – 
 Words that end with s in possessive forms – 
 Words that end with e in the genitive form – 
 Plural past perfect and perfect – 
 Third plural ending –

Comparison to Standard Finnish 

Sample text

References

External links

 Kven country names (ISO 3166) – Page with translations of all country names to Kven, Finnish, Norwegian and English.
 
 This grammar can be found in the Kven language here.
 The grammar above can be found in the Norwegian language here.
 Kven language resources at Giellatekno
 Ruijan kaiku
 Dictionary

 
Finnic languages
Finnish dialects
Languages of Norway